The Kaiyuan Tongbao, sometimes romanised as Kai Yuan Tong Bao or using the archaic Wade-Giles spelling K'ai Yuan T'ung Pao, was a Tang dynasty cash coin that was produced from 621 under the reign of Emperor Gaozu and remained in production for most of the Tang dynasty until 907. The Kaiyuan Tongbao was notably the first cash coin to use the inscription tōng bǎo (通寶) and an era title as opposed to have an inscription based on the weight of the coin as was the case with Ban Liang, Wu Zhu and many other earlier types of Chinese cash coins. The Kaiyuan Tongbao's calligraphy and inscription inspired subsequent Central Asian, Japanese, Korean, Ryūkyūan, and Vietnamese cash coins and became the standard until the last cash coin to use the inscription "通寶" was cast until the early 1940s in French Indochina.

After the fall of the Tang dynasty Kaiyuan Tongbao coins would continue to be produced by various states of the Five Dynasties and Ten Kingdoms period.

Manufacture

Wax mother coins 
 

Under the Sui and Tang dynasties mother coins reached their definite form and were produced in moulds engraved by ancestor coins, however during this same period a casting technique called "the lost wax method" was used to cast the Kaiyuan Tongbao cash coins, in this method mother coins made from wax rather than metal were used, these mother coins were produced in large quantities because they were very cheap to make, unlike metal mother coins these wax mother coins stayed in the clay moulds and when the mould heated up they would melt away leaving a cavity for the molten metal to pour into forming the coins. This technique was also used for casting other bronze items however it was only used for casting coinage during the Sui and Tang dynasties and its sudden discontinuation pointed out to the fact that it was probably inefficient for mass producing small items such as coins.

Clay moulds  

The world's only known authentic specimen of a Tang dynasty period clay mould that was used to cast Kaiyuan Tongbao cash coins was unearthed in Shutang, Wangcheng District, Changsha, Hunan on August 17, 1992 by Mr. Ceng Jingyi, a retired teacher and coin collector. The Kaiyuan Tongbao clay mould is classified as a Chinese "national treasure". 

Up until the unearthing of this clay mould in the year 1992, no moulds were known to exist for the casting of Tang dynasty coinage. The discovery of this clay mould has made it unclear as to what process was actually used to cast the Kaiyuan Tongbao cash coins.  

While the Kaiyuan Tongbao cash coins could have been cast in the traditional manner from moulds made of clay, stone, or bronze as was the case since the Warring States period, it was believed that cash coins during this period were being cast in sand using "mother coins" (母錢) to make the impressions where the circulation cash coins would later be produced from. With the discovery of this unique clay mould, however, it has now been confirmed that clay moulds were still being used by mints to cast cash coins during the Tang dynasty period.

The unique Kaiyuan Tongbao clay mould was placed on display at the "Exhibition of Chinese Ancient Coins" which was held at the Ouyang Xun Cultural Park located in Shutang.

History 

Under the Tang dynasty the earlier Wu Zhu coins of the Sui dynasty would remain the standard currency, but during the fourth year of the Wu De (武德) period (or 621 of the Gregorian calendar) Emperor Gaozu decreed that the Kaiyuan Tongbao coin be cast with a strictly enforced standard weight of  Liǎng (兩).

Unlike earlier Chinese cash coins which had their legends based on their weight, the Kaiyuan Tongbao was notably the first Chinese cash coin to use the tōng bǎo (通寶) inscription and simultaneously inspired the yuán bǎo (元寶) inscription. The reason that the Kaiyuan Tongbao also inspired the yuán bǎo legend is because the Chinese people themselves had trouble figuring out the correct character order, as the inscription is read in what was referred to as the "standard order" (top-bottom-right-left) some people accidentally read it in the wrong order as they had assumed that the inscription was read clockwise as Kaitong Yuanbao (開通元寶), this was also because rather than having the first two characters spell out the period title (which was Wu De when the Kaiyuan Tongbao was introduced), they had a different inscription. However this mistake in how the legend was read inspired the Northwest Chinese rebel Shi Siming to cast his own cash coins with the inscription Shuntian Yuanbao (順天元寶, shùn tiān yuán bǎo) cash coins first issued in Luoyang in 759, this coin however does have a clockwise inscription. Another term that was used to denote "the currency type" in Chinese coin inscriptions was zhòng bǎo (重寶) which could be translated as "heavy currency". The first cash coin to have this inscription was the Qianyuan Zhongbao (乾元重寶) which was first produced in the year 759. The terms yuán bǎo (元寶) and zhòng bǎo (重寶) which were both established during a 138 year period of the Tang dynasty would continue to be used on Chinese coins to the very end of the Qing dynasty in 1911. While the term tōng bǎo (通寶) was even used longer with the last Chinese cash coin, the Minguo Tongbao (民國通寶) being produced in Dongchuan, Yunnan during the early Republic of China period.

Another important difference with the inscription of the Kaiyuan Tongbao compared to earlier Chinese cash coins was that it was not written in seal script but rather in the more plain calligraphic clerical script. The Emperor asked one of China's most well-known calligraphers, Ouyang Xun to write down the legend of the cash coin. This was also the first time in Chinese history that a famous calligrapher wrote the characters for a Chinese cash coin. Minting and copper extraction were centrally controlled, and private casting was punishable by death. For the first time we find regulations giving the prescribed coinage alloy: 83% copper, 15% lead, and 2% tin. Previously the percentages used seem to have been on an ad hoc basis. Actual analyses show rather less copper than this.

At first, mints were set up in Luoyang in Henan, and also in Peking, Chengdu, Bingzhou (Taiyuan in Shanxi), and then Guilin in Guangxi. Minting rights were also granted to some princes and officials. By 660, deterioration of the coinage due to forgery had become a problem. The regulations were reaffirmed in 718, and forgeries suppressed. In 737, the first commissioner with overall responsibility for casting was appointed. 1 furnace that produced 3.3 million Kaiyuan Tongbao coins a year during the Tian Bao period between 713 and 756 would need 21220 jin of copper, 3709 jin of tin, and 540 jin per regulation of lead and had an average waste of 23,5 %. The Kaiyuan Tongbao cash coins produced during the Tian Bao period had an officially set copper alloy however some Kaiyuan coins from this period were blue or white it's likely that other alloys were also used. In 739, ten mints were recorded, with a total of 89 furnaces casting some 327,000 strings of cash a year. 123 liang of metal were needed to produce a string of coins weighing 100 liang. In the late 740s, skilled artisans were employed for casting, rather than conscripted peasants. Despite these measures, the coinage continued to deteriorate. In 808, a ban on hoarding coins was proclaimed. This was repeated in 817. Regardless of the rank of a person, they could not hold more than 5,000 strings of cash. Cash balances exceeding this amount had to be expended within two months to purchase goods. This was an attempt to compensate for the lack of cash in circulation. By 834, mint output had fallen to 100,000 strings a year, mainly due to the shortage of copper. Forgeries using lead and tin alloys were produced.

Due to the fact that this continued to be produced for two centuries by various mints all over China there are several hundred varieties of the Kaiyuan Tongbao that can be distinguished from each other due to slight differences.

The Kaiyuan Tongbao cash coins that were first cast until the height of the Tang period, early issues can be very accurately assigned to their time of casting and archeological evidence from Tang era tombs indeed prove that the first stroke of the character "元" are shorter than later versions, for this reason these coins are referred to as "short one yuan" (短一元, duǎn yī yuán) versions. A lesser quantity of these early Kaiyuan Tongbao cash coins are made from what the Chinese call "white copper" (白銅, bái tóng) and are subsequently referred to as "White Copper/Baitong Kaiyuan Tongbao coins" (白銅開元通寶, báitóng kāiyuán tōng bǎo) today, however during the Tang dynasty itself they were given the nickname "pure coins" (青錢, qīng qián) which also became the basis for the nickname (外號) of "pure coin scholar" (青錢學士, qīng qián xué shì) which was given to Emperor Gaozong as his writings were said to resemble the coins.

There also exist Kaiyuan Tongbao cash coins which are differentiated by their second horizontal stroke, other than the first variant these others quite rare. The following versions of the Kaiyuan Tongbao coin can be distinguished by the "元" character's second horizontal stroke (or "shoulder"):

Kaiyuan Tongbao cash coins also commonly have differentiating features on their reverse, these can include crescents which according to legend happened when either Empress Zhangsun or Empress Taimu or in some versions of the story Yang Guifei pressed her fingernail into a specimen Kaiyuan Tongbao coin made from wax. Other sources claim that the crescents were added due to foreign influence. Today it is widely believed that these crescents were marks of quality used by various mints. 

Other than crescents, there were several Kaiyuan Tongbao coins with other reverse decorations, these include:

Early Kaiyuan Tongbao coins are easily identified due to their deeply cut characters that never touch the rim of the coin, these are called "separate from the rim" Kaiyuan Tongbao coins, while the reverse of these coins tend to have uniform and clear rims. Later variants of the Kaiyuan Tongbao often have excess metal between the strokes of the Hanzi characters and even later variants have characters with strokes so long that they touch the rim, meanwhile the rims on the reverse side of these Kaiyuan Tongbao coins tend to be irregular and relatively flat.

Huichang era Kaiyuan Tongbao cash coins 

Huichang Kaiyuan Tongbao cash coins are a series of Kaiyuan Tongbao coins produced under Emperor Wuzong who was a devout Taoist and used the reign era name of huìchāng (會昌), during the 5th year of this epoch (845) Emperor Wuzong ordered the casting of new coins with the inscription Kaiyuan Tongbao to be manufactured of bronze acquired by melting confiscated statues, copper bells, gongs, incense burners, and other copper items from Buddhist temples. These local mints were under the control of the provincial governors. The New Tang History states that Li Shen, governor of Huainan province, requested that the empire might cast coins bearing the name of the prefecture in which they were cast, and this was agreed. These Kaiyuan Tongbao cash coins differed from earlier variants due to the fact that they had the character chāng (昌) on their reverse side, other mints in China then adopted this and soon 23 mints produced Kaiyuan Tongbao coins with their own mint marks. Huichang Kaiyuan Tongbao coins are also of inferior workmanship compared to earlier coins and are diminutive in size. When Emperor Emperor Xuanzong ascended to the throne in the year 846, the aforementioned policy was reversed, and the new coins were recast to make Buddhist statues.

The following mint marks could be found on Huichang Kaiyuan Tongbao cash coins:

Influence outside of China

Japan 

Japanese "Fuhonsen" and later the Wadōkaichin were modelled after the Tang dynasty's Kaiyuan Tongbao coin using similar calligraphy.

Sogdia 

During excavations in the historically Sogdian cities of Afrasiab (old Samarkand) and Pendjikent a large number of Sogdian coins were uncovered, the Soviet numismatist Smirnova listed in her catalogue on Sogdian coins from 1573 published in 1981 a large number of coins of which several were based on Kaiyuan Tongbao's. Sogdian coins tend to be produced independently by each city and contain tribal mint marks known as tamgha's, some cities used coins based on Persian coinages (which made up 13.2% of the known variants), while others preferred Chinese cash coins which were influenced by the Tang dynasty's western expanse during the seventh century (cash style coins also made up the majority of Sogdian coins and accounted for 86.7% of all known variants), as well as hybrid coins which feature an image based on a square hole on one side of the coin and a portrait of the King in the other side (these made up 0.7% of the known variants).

A number of Sogdian coins even imitate the Kaiyuan Tongbao inscription directly, but on their reverses have added Sogdian tamgha's on the right or left side of the hole as well as the Sogdian word for "lord". The modern era these Sogdian Kaiyuan Tongbao coins are reproduced in large numbers by forgers in Hong Kong, these forgeries have proven to be very difficult to differentiate from the original coins and are abundant in quantity.

Vietnam 

Vietnamese cash coins produced from the Đinh until the late Trần dynasty tend to be heavily based on the Chinese Kaiyuan Tongbao cash coins, an example would be the Lý dynasty era Thiên Tư Nguyên Bảo (天資元寶) cash coins cast under Emperor Lý Cao Tông which uses two distinct styles of Chinese calligraphy, one of them is a native Lý dynasty style and the other is based on the Kaiyuan Tongbao, often the Chinese character "Nguyên" (元) on older Vietnamese coins is copied directly from Chinese Kaiyuan Tongbao coins, particularly how the left hook of the character moves upwards, although variants of the characters in "pure Vietnamese styles" were cast simultaneously. Like many Kaiyuan Tongbao coins many of these early Vietnamese cash coins would add reverse crescents or mint marks which were often wholly borrowed from the calligraphic style of the Kaiyuan Tongbao. Every early Vietnamese cash coin that has a reverse inscription is based on the Kaiyuan Tongbao.

Modern influence  
 

 A Kaiyuan Tongbao cash coin appears on the reverse side of a 2010 Hong Kong banknote issued by the Standard Chartered Bank with a face value of $1,000. 

 In 2013 a sculpture of a Kaiyuan Tongbao with a diameter of 24 meters (or 78.7 feet) and a thickness of 3.8 meters (or 12.5 feet) was constructed to be displayed at the Baoshan National Mining Park (宝山国家矿山工园) theme park in the Guiyang Prefecture of Chenzhou, Hunan. The sculpture is notably of a Huichang Kaiyuan Tongbao with the Gui (桂) mint mark. 

 There is a 10 meter tall Kaiyuan Tongbao-shaped door which stands on a bridge in the Jiangxia District of Wuhan, Hubei.

Hoards of Kaiyuan Tongbao cash coins

See also 

 Flying cash

Notes

References

Sources 

 

Coins of China
Economy of the Tang dynasty
Chinese numismatics 
Cash coins by inscription